The Mycoporaceae are a family of fungi in the order Pleosporales.

References

External links 
 Index Fungorum

Monogeneric fungus families